Bang Lamung is a township (thesaban tambon) in Bang Lamung district, Chonburi province, Thailand.  Bang Lamung covers parts of the tambon Bang Lamung, Nong Pla Lai and Takhian Tia. As of 2006 it had a population of 9,170.

The town is not far from Laem Chabang and Pattaya. Sukhumvit Road passes through the town.

Populated places in Chonburi province